Brial is a surname.

List of people with the surname 

 Aloisia Brial (died 1972), queen of Uvea
 Michael Brial (born 1970), Australian former rugby union player
 Sylvain Brial (born 1964), French politician

See also 

 Braille

Surnames of Oceanian origin
Surnames of French origin